Braceface is an animated television series produced by Nelvana Limited and Jade Animation (Shenzhen) Company, and was produced in association with Teletoon and Fox Family Channel for the first season. The show features actress Alicia Silverstone from the movie Clueless (who also voiced the titular character for the first two seasons) serving as executive producer.

Summary
The series, set in Elkford, British Columbia, recounts the travails of Sharon Spitz (a play on words, "sharing spit" being a euphemism for kissing), who is a junior high school student with braces that get in the way of leading a normal teenage life. Her braces are somehow electrically charged at all times, giving her strange abilities such as remotely operating machinery, tapping into wireless communication channels, and even discharging electricity directly into what's in front of her, though much of these abilities are often outside her control. In the first season, she is enrolled at Mary Pickford Junior High but later the show progresses Sharon into going to high school.

Cast and characters
Alicia Silverstone (Seasons 1-2)/Stacey DePass (Season 3) as Sharon Esther Spitz: The lead character of the show.
Dan Petronijevic as Adam Spitz: Adam is Sharon and Josh's older brother.
Michael Cera as Josh Spitz: Josh is Adam and Sharon's younger brother.
Tamara Bernier Evans as Helen Spitz: Helen is Adam, Sharon, and Josh's divorced mother.
Marnie McPhail as Maria Wong: Maria is Sharon's classmate and best friend, who is of mixed Chinese and Italian descent.
Peter Oldring as Connor Mackenzie: Connor is Sharon's another classmate and best friend.
Vince Corazza as Alden Jones: Alden is Sharon's crush at school and boyfriend. They later break up. Sharon and Alden eventually get back together.
Katie Griffin as Nina Harper: Nina is Sharon's nemesis at school and ex-best friend.
Tabitha St. Germain as Christy Lee: Christy is Nina's classmate and best friend.
Linda Ballantyne as Veronique Peters: Veronique is Nina's classmate and another best friend.
Daniel DeSanto as Brock Leighton: Brock is Alden's classmate and best friend, who is of African-Canadian descent.
Emily Hampshire as Alyson Malitski: Nina's ex-best friend and Sharon's new best friend. Has a relationship with Connor.
Elisa Moolecherry as Hannah Corbett: Elisa is Adam's girlfriend, who appeared in some episodes.

Episodes

Production
The series was produced by the Canadian animation studio Nelvana and Jade Animation (Shenzhen) in China, with the additional pre-production work done by Studio B Productions and Atomic Cartoons.

Reception
Sarah Wenk from Common Sense Media rated the series three out of five stars, stating "ultimately it's rather lightweight and, well, cartoony. There's nothing wrong with that, but it could use a bit more substance and less silliness." Nancy Wellons from Orlando Sentinel stated "What could be a wonderful premise about the struggle of adolescents to confirm and yet remain individuals instead turns into a half-hour full of inane jokes, cliched characters and bad dialogue." Evan Levine from Newspaper Enterprise Assn. wrote, "The brace subplot sometimes adds an uneasy note — is it fantasy? — and can be vaguely confusing. But the show holds the possibility of being a clever takeoff of the preteen years, whether you have braces or not." Jeanne Spreier from Knight Ridder wrote, "Braceface takes a refreshingly light look at junior high challenges — boys, braces, friends, popularity, parents, school — without giving in to nastiness, violence, ill-will or dejection."

In 2004, the episode "Ms. Spitz Goes To Warsch & Stone" won an award at the Environmental Media Awards.

Telecast and home media
In the United States, the series originally aired on Fox Family Channel starting on June 2, 2001, with reruns on its successor ABC Family until May 26, 2003. Disney Channel later aired reruns from May 2, 2004 until the summer of 2005, but some episodes were edited for content and time. Four episodes ("The Worst Date Ever. Period", "Miami Vices", "Whose Life Is It, Anyway?" and "Grey Matters") were skipped from Disney Channel airings due to their content. Half of season 2 (episodes 16 through 26) and the entirety of season 3 never aired in the United States. In Canada, it ran on Teletoon from June 30, 2001 to September 1, 2004.

Internationally, the series aired on Fox Kids, Channel 5 and Pop Girl in the United Kingdom. It also aired on Nickelodeon in Germany and South Africa. In India, the series aired on Star One. It aired in Ireland on RTÉ Two from 3 September 2001 to 2005. In Japan, Braceface was aired on STAR Plus Japan. In the Netherlands, the show aired on Fox Kids/Jetix.

In Canada, DVD releases of the series were released by KaBOOM! Entertainment, and in the U.S., DVDs were released by Funimation Entertainment.

In the United Kingdom, Maverick Entertainment released a DVD titled "Brace Yourself" in 2006, which contains the first four episodes. Fremantle Home Entertainment later released two more DVDs.

Currently, the series is now streaming on both networks, FilmRise Kids and Tubi. The series is also available to stream on Prime Video, iTunes, Google Play and YouTube (thru Nelvana's Keep it Weird! Channel). As of February 28, 2022, reruns can be seen on Nickelodeon Canada weeknights at 4:00 AM.

References

External links
 Official site
 
 Production website

2001 Canadian television series debuts
2004 Canadian television series endings
2000s Canadian animated television series
2000s Canadian teen sitcoms
Canadian children's animated comedy television series
2001 Chinese television series debuts
2004 Chinese television series endings
Chinese children's animated comedy television series
English-language television shows
Funimation
Middle school television series
Teen animated television series
Teletoon original programming
Fox Family Channel original programming
ABC Family original programming
Fox Kids
Disney Channel original programming
Television series by Nelvana
Television shows set in British Columbia